Lauryn Hill is an American singer, rapper, and songwriter. With a total of 8 wins from the Grammy Awards for her music (including her work in The Fugees), she is the most Grammy awarded female rapper. Hill was the first female hip hop artist to win the Grammy Awards for Best Rap Album (with The Fugees), and Best New Artist. Her first and only solo studio album, The Miseducation of Lauryn Hill, won five awards at the 41st Annual Grammy Awards, including Album of the Year, making it the first hip hop album to win the award, and making Hill the youngest black artist to win the award; Hill walked away with a total of five awards that night, breaking the record at the time for most awards won by a female artist in single ceremony, and set the current record for most nominations received by a female artist in a single ceremony.

In 2000, Hill won a consecutive Grammy Award for Album of the Year, as a producer on Santana's Supernatural, becoming the only female artist to win the award in two consecutive years, and the only female artist to win as a lead artist and as a producer. Hill was awarded Video of the Year at the 1999 MTV Video Music Awards, for her music video "Doo Wop (That Thing)", becoming the first hip hop video to win. Additionally Hill has won four NAACP Image Awards, Including the President's Award.

In 2015, she received the Golden Note Award from American Society of Composers, Authors and Publishers; and has won additional songwriting awards for her credits on Drake's "Nice for What", Aretha Franklin's "A Rose Is Still a Rose", Cardi B's "Be Careful", and Kanye West's "All Falls Down". Hill has broken a total of four Guinness World Records, throughout her career. In 2022, Hill was inducted into the Black Music & Entertainment Walk of Fame.

Awards and nominations

Other accolades

State honors

World records

Atlanta Hip Hop Film Festival

Black Music & Entertainment Walk of Fame

Columbia High School Hall of Fame

Vevo Certified Awards 
Vevo Certified Award honors artists with over 100 million views on Vevo and its partners (including YouTube) through special features on the Vevo website. It was launched in June 2012.

Notes

References 

Hill, Lauryn
Awards